Roodt-sur-Syre or Roodt-sur-Syr is a town in the commune of Betzdorf, in eastern Luxembourg, and about 15 km from Luxembourg City.  , the town has a population of 1,950 inhabitants.

The town is the location of the Yemeni consulate in Luxembourg. Panelux, a large bread making company, has production facilities on the outskirts of the town.

References

Betzdorf, Luxembourg
Towns in Luxembourg